Tom Hutyler  is a Seattle, Washington radio personality and, since 1987, the public address announcer for the Seattle Mariners.  Hutyler is also currently a sports reporter and news anchor for KOMO.  Hutyler began his radio career in 1976 in Spokane, Washington, where he was born. A year later he relocated to Seattle to join the on-air staff at KJR (AM), and a few years later Hutyler helped launch KUBE to prominence as a Top 40 station.  While at KUBE Hutyler wrote and produced a video tribute to the city of Seattle.  He has worked for various Seattle stations in addition to those just mentioned, including KVI and KLSY.  In 2018, he wrote and sang a song saluting Washington State University quarterback Gardner Minshew, titled "The Mississippi Mustache" which garnered over 55,000 YouTube Views.

In 2001, the Akron Beacon Journal referred to Hutyler as the "Voice of God".

External links
Interview of Hutyler about his Mariners announcing duties

Seattle Mariners announcers
Major League Baseball public address announcers
Living people
People from Spokane, Washington
Year of birth missing (living people)